Gregerson is a surname. Notable people with the surname include:

 Craig Roger Gregerson (born  1986), American murderer
 Linda Gregerson (born 1950), American poet
 Luke Gregerson (born 1984), American baseball player
 Mia Gregerson (born 1972), American politician

See also
 Gregersen